"The Winnowing" is a science fiction short story by American writer Isaac Asimov. The story was written at the request of William Levinson, editor of the US publication Physician's World, but when the latter ceased publication, the story was returned to the author, who then sold it to Analog. It appeared in the February 1976 edition.

Plot summary
In the year 2005, the world's population of six billion is suffering from acute famine. The World Food Organization decides on desperate measures to decrease the population by a process of triage. They propose to do this by adding selective poisons to certain food shipments to grossly over-populated areas.

They attempt to blackmail biochemist Dr. Aaron Rodman into cooperating with their scheme (threatening to withhold food rations from his daughter's family if he doesn't comply), proposing to utilise his development of LP – a lipoprotein which when incorporated into foods will cause random deaths.

The scheme is planned but Rodman is unwilling to go along with it. At a meeting between him and senior government officials and members of the World Food Council, he provides sandwiches laced with the LP as refreshment, so that they will die at random, just as they had planned for so many others. He carefully matches the LP in the sandwiches (which he also eats) to his own metabolism, so that he will die quickly and not be guilty of involvement in the scheme.

See also 
 The Population Bomb by Paul R. Ehrlich
 Famine 1975!
 The Great Reset by Klaus Schwab
 Lifeboat ethics

External links 
 

Short stories by Isaac Asimov
1970 short stories
Works originally published in Analog Science Fiction and Fact
Fiction set in 2005